Tanya Markova is a Filipino rock band formed in the indie scene in 2006 and went mainstream in 2010. The band is currently composed of Harlon Agsaoay, Gel del Pilar, Pipoy Alejandro, Rhan Sabas, Kix Chavez, Ole Romblon, Japo Anareta, and Levi Arago. The band is recognizable due to their makeup and costumes, with each member having an onstage persona.

History

Formation
Tanya Markova was formed in 2002 by San Beda University classmates Harlon Agsaoay and Gel del Pilar. Del Pilar immediately thought of an idea to combine sappy melodies and dark caricature-driven lyrics, then they decided to compose songs filled with sarcasm, idiocy, and childish ramblings. During those times the song they have created were only meant to be a joke with nonsensical titles. It took several months before they could find members who would agree to their concept, and almost 2 years to complete the line-up and perform live onstage. The said members originally hail from Bacolod, San Carlos City (Negros Occidental), Isabela, Leyte and some in Metro Manila.

Tragedy and hiatus
The band was on their lowest point on September 9, 2009 due to the unexpected death of lead guitarist Jollybee "Jbee" Borbajo a.k.a. Sugar K. in a freak vacation accident together with actor and friend Dennis Trillo. Due to this sudden loss, the band declared a hiatus in order to deal with the emotional experience and to think about the band's direction. In December 2009, Kid Guevarra went back to Manila to play lead guitar for Tanya Markova once again. He was actually Tanya Markova’s original guitarist (Sugar K. previously played drums before switching to guitars when Rufa Mae Milby decided to join) and was able to play in a few gigs and became involved on Tanya Markova’s first few demos but he decided to go back to Bacolod due to personal and work reasons. When Sugar K. (who was also originally from Bacolod) died, he was the only guitarist on their mind that could fill his shoes. Kid Guevarra decided to don the Jennylyn Sucaldito suit again.

MCA Music, Tanya Markova, and present status (2010–present)
On January 19, 2010 the band were signed by MCA Music Philippines (whose OPM line-up includes top brass artists like Chicosci, Urbandub, Pedicab, The Dawn and Franco among others). On April 12, 2010, the band released their self-titled debut album Tanya Markova under MCA Music. They have released the singles "Picture Picture", "Disney", and "Linda Blair". After a few changes in their lineup, the band still continues to release music online.

Band's name
The band got their name from Filipina actress Tanya Garcia and the last name from Dolphy's bakla movie character, Markova. It's also a coincidence that an anagram of "Tanya Markova" is "Natay Karovam/Natay Karubam", an Ilocano word meaning "Dead Neighbor". The concept of the members' stage names is inspired by the band Marilyn Manson whose early members combined the names of notable personalities to form their own stage names.

Members
Norma Love – lead vocals
Iwa Motors – co-lead vocals, additional guitar
Mowmow – tambourine, percussion, backing vocals
Rez Curtis – rhythm guitar
Skrovak Iskopanjo – bass guitar
Isabel Olé – lead guitar, occasional backing vocals
Robot Jaworski  – keyboard synthesizer, backing vocals
Levy Poe – drums, percussion

Former members
Jennylyn Sucaldito – lead guitar
Heart Abunda – keyboard synthesizer
Rufa Mae Milby – drums
Sam Quinto – drums
Sugar K† (deceased) – lead guitar

Touring members
 Jun Paredes (Jun Tovera) – bass guitar
 Kenneth B. Reached (Kenneth Floria) – bass guitar

Discography

Studio albums
 Tanya Markova (2010)
 Tanya Markova Shock Pop Edition (2012)
 Mister Tililing (2016)

EP
 Ang mga Awitin ng Normal na Tao (2021)

Singles
 "Picture Picture"
 "Disney"
 "Linda Blair"
 "P.A. Roadie Fernandez"
 "Da Facebook Song"
 "Jacuzzi"
 "Creep"
 "Hello Hello Hello"
 "Ang Darling Kong Zombie"
 "High-End"
 "Iglap" 
 "Stranded"
 "Bituin"
 "Medusa"

Music videos
 "Picture Picture"
 "Disney"
 "Linda Blair"
 "P.A. Roadie Fernandez"
 "Da Facebook Song"
 "Jacuzzi"
 "Hello Hello Hello"
 "Ang Darling Kong Zombie"
 "High-End"
 "Iglap"
 "Stranded"
 "Bituin"

Awards and nominations

References

External links
 Tanya Markova Official Facebook
 Tanya Markova Official MySpace
 Tanya Markova Rakista Profile
 Who is Tanya Markova

Filipino rock music groups
MCA Music Inc. (Philippines) artists
Musical groups from Manila
Musical groups established in 2006